William Murray (19 April 1912 – 21 September 1995) was a British educationist who created the Ladybird Peter and Jane books.

Early life
He was born in County Londonderry.

Career
He worked as a teacher. He became a headmaster at two schools in Cheltenham and a County Education Advisor for Devon. He lectured throughout Britain on the teaching of reading.

Learning to read
He published a booklet called Key Words to Literacy  with the education psychologist Joe McNally from the University of Manchester. The booklet described that they had found that in the English language that children spoke, twelve words accounted for one quarter of all words, one hundred accounted for half, and three hundred accounted for three-quarters.

Ladybird
The Key Words Reading Scheme, taking his ideas, was first published in 1964, with Peter and Jane, and went on to sell over 80 million copies of the books in the series.

Peter and Jane were based on the real-life children (Jill Ashurst and Christopher Edwards) of a neighbour of the books' illustrator Harry Wingfield. Martin Aitchison and John Berry also illustrated the books.

He retired from teaching in 1970.

Personal life
He married Edith and they had a son, who went on to be a teacher and headmaster, and daughter. He died in Cheltenham at the age of 83. He lived on Leckhampton Road in Cheltenham.

References

External links
 Cheltenham exhibition
 History

Early childhood education in the United Kingdom
British educational theorists
20th-century British educators
Literacy advocates
People from Cheltenham
British education writers

1912 births

1995 deaths